Albert Robert Mills (16 January 1894 – 6 December 1964) was a British long-distance runner. He competed in the marathon at the 1920 and 1924 Summer Olympics.

Mills ran his first marathon in 1920, winning the Poly race in a new British record of 2:37:40.4. He also won the Poly race in 1921 and 1922, and competed for England internationally in cross-country running in 1920–1921 and 1923.

References

External links
 

1894 births
1964 deaths
Athletes (track and field) at the 1920 Summer Olympics
Athletes (track and field) at the 1924 Summer Olympics
British male long-distance runners
British male marathon runners
Olympic athletes of Great Britain
People from the Borough of Boston
People from Wyberton